Mohammad Reza Mokhtari is an Iranian Greco-Roman wrestler. He reached semi final in the 72 kg event at the 2021 World Wrestling Championships held in Oslo, Norway.

He won the gold medal in the 72 kg event at 2022 Asian Wrestling Championships.

He won gold medal in the 72 kg event at 2021 Vehbi Emre & Hamit Kaplan Tournament.

References

External links 
 
 

Living people
2000 births
Iranian male sport wrestlers
Asian Wrestling Championships medalists
People from Shiraz
Sportspeople from Fars province
21st-century Iranian people